Army men, or plastic soldiers, are toy soldiers that are about  tall and most commonly molded from olive green, relatively unbreakable plastic. Unlike the more expensive toy soldiers available in hobby shops, army men are sold at low prices in discount stores and supermarkets in bulk packaging. Army men are traditionally green and almost always dressed in modern military uniforms and armed with 20th-century weapons. 'Jumbo' army men are a less common secondary scale with  soldiers made with the same process.

Description
Plastic army men are sold in plastic bags or buckets, and often include different colors such as green, tan, or gray, to represent opposing sides. They are equipped with a variety of weapons, typically from World War II to the current era, often depicting the 1964 Vietnam-era M-16 rifle with fixed M7 bayonet. These include rifles, machine guns, submachine guns, sniper rifles, pistols, grenades, flamethrowers, mortars, and bazookas. They may also have radio men, binocular scouts, and minesweepers. The traditional helmets are the older M1 "steel pot" style that were issued to US soldiers during the middle to late 20th century. Typical accoutrements depicted are often 1960s-era M1911 style pistols, ammunition pouches, and water canteens. Army men are sometimes packaged with additional accessories including tanks (often based on the M48 Patton tank), jeeps, armed hovercraft, half-tracks, artillery, flags, army trucks, helicopters, fighter jets, landing craft and fortifications. Their vehicles are usually manufactured in a smaller scale, to save on production and packaging costs.  Army men are considered toys and not models; and as such, historical and chronological accuracy are generally not a priority.

History and varieties
The first American plastic toy soldiers were made by Bergen Toy & Novelty Co. (Beton for short) in 1938. Beton also acquired the molds of another pre-war plastic figure company, Universal Plastics with their figures remaining for sale when lead toy production was stopped in 1942. The Beton figures were painted like metal figures and sold the same as their metal brethren; individually or in a boxed set of around seven figures. Following World War II, Beton modified their figures in an attempt to change the World War I type helmet into the World War II one.

Following World War II, plastic manufacture was seen as an industry with growth potential with many old and new companies making plastic figures that were widely available in the United States. Army men following the war were sold unpainted, usually in a green color corresponding to United States Army uniforms in World War II. 

Beginning in the early 1950s, Louis Marx and Company sold boxed sets of figures and accessories called playsets, such as "US Army Training Center" and the later "Battleground" sets. A rival manufacturer, the Multiple Plastics Corporation (MPC) also sold plastic figures in various colors with different separate accessories, so the same figures could be kitted out as soldiers (green), farmers, pioneers or cowboys (brown), policemen (blue), ski troopers (white) spacemen (various colors), or American Civil War soldiers in blue and gray.

The economy of plastic sold in bulk, popularity of army men, and competition with manufacturers led to army men being sold in large bags by Marx, Tim-Mee Toys and MPC for as little as a penny a piece in the mid-1960s. During this time, Marx gave the American army men actual enemy soldiers to fight such as German soldiers (molded in gray) in their 1962 "Army Combat" set and Japanese soldiers (molded in yellow) in their "Iwo Jima" set that was released in 1963. In 1965, a "D-Day" Marx set featured Allies such as French (horizon blue), British (khaki), and Russians. One of their last and largest playsets was the multi-level "Fortress Navarone" mountain set based on The Guns of Navarone, which was available in the 1970s and pitted World War II Americans against Germans.

During the Vietnam War, sales and availability of military toys began to decline alongside the unpopularity of the war and the higher prices of plastic from the 1973 oil crisis. Since 1975 many manufacturers of plastic soldiers in Europe and US closed, for example John Hill & Company, Reamsa,  Louis Marx and Company, and Dinky Toys.

Today most army men are made inexpensively in China and do not include the extensive accessories that were common in Marx playsets. They are also smaller on average, often not much more than 2.5 cm (one inch) high. Most of these figures are generic imitations of model figure sets from such companies as Airfix and Matchbox. They vary widely in quality.

In addition to army men, other inexpensive, plastic toy figures are also commonly available. Toy cowboys and Indians, farm sets, spacemen, knights, dinosaurs, firemen, police officers and other playsets are often sold alongside army men.

In September of 2019, BMC Toys, a maker of army men, announced that army women would be sold in 2020. This announcement was made due to popular request from female veterans and toy fans. The most well-known request is from a six-year-old girl who sent a handwritten letter for them to be made.

Army men in culture

In 2011, Time magazine placed the army men on their list of 100 most popular toys of all time. This cultural phenomenon was represented in Army Men, a popular series of video games introduced by 3DO in the 1990s. Green army men were also among the characters in the 1995 Disney Pixar animated film, Toy Story and its three sequels. Gummy army men candy are also available.

Because these toys do not cost much, they are virtually disposable. They encourage a variety of creative types of play, because they can be set up in many different ways. They are especially well suited for the sandbox, or simple wargames with rubber balls or marbles, which can be rolled or thrown at army men.

Army men have been banned from schools and daycare programs with zero tolerance weapon policies. On one occasion, children were asked to clip the weapons off of plastic army men on display during an elementary school graduation ceremony. When Burger King released tie-in toys for the movie Toy Story, the green army men were not featured with weapons, but only the variations of leader, radio operator, minesweeper, and man with binoculars.

An unusual use for army men was attaching poems to them and scattering them around in a "guerrilla poetry" scheme. They have also been the exclusive (albeit stop-motion) actors in a music video featuring an instrumental track by the band Pink Martini.

The 1972 Stephen King short story "Battleground", and a 2006 episode of Nightmares and Dreamscapes: From the Stories of Stephen King based upon the short story, feature plastic army men who come alive with sinister intentions.

In Witching & Bitching, a 2013 Spanish horror-comedy film co-written and directed by Álex de la Iglesia, Mario Casas impersonates a thief disguised as street mime. Dressed as a green army man, his skin, helmet and uniform are completely painted in the typical bright green color.

In Heroes of the Storm (2015), a multiplayer video game by Blizzard Entertainment, there are several hero skins with green army men theme.

More whimsical variations of army men toy soldiers are also available, including figures molded in yoga poses.

Russian masked soldiers operating inside Ukraine during the 2014 annexation of Crimea by the Russian Federation became known as "little green men" in reference to the green plastic toy soldiers.

See also
Little Wars
Toy playset
Reamsa plastic toy soldier
Miniature wargaming
Model figure
Figurine
Action figure
List of toys

References

Toy figurines
1940s toys
1950s toys
1960s toys
1970s toys
1980s toys
War in popular culture
1938 introductions
Works about armies